Ramón Llorens Pujadas (1 November 1906 – 4 February 1985) was a Spanish professional football player and coach.

Career
Born in Barcelona, Llorens played as a goalkeeper for Barcelona between 1926 and 1938, making 86 first team appearances in all competitions. At 1.64m tall, he is the shortest goalkeeper in the club's history. He later worked for the club as a coach spending 53 years with the club. He also managed the club in 1950.

He also fought in the Spanish Civil War.

References

1906 births
1985 deaths
Spanish footballers
FC Barcelona players
La Liga players
Association football goalkeepers
Spanish football managers
FC Barcelona managers
FC Barcelona non-playing staff
Footballers from Barcelona
Association football coaches